Several monarchs have used golden coaches. These horse-drawn coaches were made of wood and covered with gold leaf, a solid golden coach would be very expensive and so heavy that it would be a practical impossibility.

Although a gilden coach with or without painted panels was a sign of high social and governamental status, the position of the occupants of the coach determines the number of horses that draw the vehicle. Monarchs have the right to be drawn by eight horses. A prince of the blood royal uses six horses, a nobleman four.

Golden coaches in use today

 The Gold State Coach of the British monarchs built for George III.
 The Golden Coach of the Dutch monarchs, built for Queen Wilhelmina of the Netherlands 
 The Golden Coupé (Denmark) of the Danish monarchs. A small and elegant coach, often called "the coach of Christian VIII", is gilded with 24 carat gold leaf and is drawn by eight horses ridden à la Deaumont. It was built in 1840 by the British coachbuilder Henry Fife for the Danish King Christian VIII The coach is still used on important occasions.

Golden coaches in museums
Several coaches of former monarchies are stored or exhibited in European or Asian museums.

 The Coronation Coach of Charles X in the Grand Stables in Versailles
 The court of the Russian czars used several golden coaches, last used when Nicholas II was crowned emperor of Russia in 1896. A miniature of one of them is placed inside the Imperial Coronation Egg.
 The gilded coronation coach of Sweden has last been used in 1970. It is on display in the King's stables in Stockholm.
 The Prince of Liechtenstein owns a Golden Carriage. It was built for Prince Joseph Wenzel von Liechtenstein and the panels were painted by François Boucher and Hyacinthe Rigaud. It is kept in the Palais Liechtenstein in Vienna.
 The National Coach Museum (Portuguese: Museu Nacional dos Coches) in Lisbon houses several golden coaches of the defunct Portuguese monarchy.
 The Imperial Coach is kept at the Imperial Carriage Museum in Vienna. It houses the collection of coaches of the former Austro-Hungarian monarchy 
 The Nymphenburg Palace in Münich contains the golden coaches of the Bavarian Dukes and Kings.
 The golden Coach of the King of Spain is on display in Madrid.

References

Royal carriages